Shai Maestro (born February 5, 1987) is an Israeli jazz pianist.

Biography
Shai Maestro began playing classical piano aged five and graduated from the Thelma Yellin High School of Performing Arts in Givataim, Israel. After winning the National Jazz Ensembles Competition Jazz Signs in 2002 and 2003 and receiving scholarships (2004 to 2010) from the America-Israel Cultural Fund for jazz piano, he attended Berklee College of Music's Five-Week Summer Performance Program in Boston, where he was awarded a scholarship to attend Berklee, an offer he declined.

A few weeks later, bassist Avishai Cohen invited him to join his trio with drummer Mark Guiliana. He recorded four albums with the Avishai Cohen Trio, including two for Blue Note: Gently Disturbed (2008), Sensitive Hours (2008), Aurora (2009), and Seven Seas (2011). He toured with the trio.

In July 2010, Maestro formed a trio and recorded Shai Maestro Trio for the French label Laborie Jazz. The trio toured around the world, playing up to 80 concerts a year and sharing stages with groups led by Chick Corea, Tigran Hamasyan, Esperanza Spalding, and Diana Krall. In 2012, the trio released their second album, The Road to Ithaca, for Laborie Jazz. This was followed by Untold Stories (2015) and The Stone Skipper (2016). The albums were praised by DownBeat magazine, NPR, BBC, and WBGO's The Checkout. He recorded The Dream Thief (ECM) with Ofri Nehemya on drums and Jorge Roeder on bass. The album was recorded at Lugano's Auditorio Stelio Molo RSI in April 2018 and was produced by Manfred Eicher. Besides his trio, he contributed to an album by vocalist Theo Bleckmann.

Discography

As leader

As sideman
 Gently Disturbed – Avishai Cohen (2008)
 Aurora – Avishai Cohen (2009)
 Seven Seas – Avishai Cohen (2011)
 Like a Great River – Oded Tzur (2015)
 Translator's Note – Oded Tzur (2017)

References

External links 
 

1987 births
Living people
Israeli jazz pianists
Male jazz musicians
21st-century pianists
21st-century male musicians
Motéma Music artists
ECM Records artists